The Texas Longhorns women's golf team has been to the NCAA Championship 27 times, tied for 7th overall and finished as the runner-up, or tied for runner-up, twice, in 1993 and 2002. As of 2019, they have finished in the top 5 eight times, most recently in 2019 (t-5th) and 2003 (3rd). In 2019 Texas won its first NCAA Regional in school history and was the stroke play medalist at the NCAA Championship.

Texas women have won three individual championships. In 1978 Deborah Petrizzi won the AIAW national intercollegiate individual golf championship; and Charlotta Sörenstam and Heather Bowie won in 1993 and 1997 respectively. Former players Betsy Rawls and Sherri Steinhauer went on to win 8 and 2 LPGA major championships respectively, with Rawls being inducted into the World Golf Hall of Fame.

Yearly record

AIAW
Texas competed in the Association for Intercollegiate Athletics for Women championships#Golf from 1975-1982.

NCAA
Texas has competed in NCAA since 1983.

Individual champions

National

Conference

National honors

U.S. Women's Amateur champions
1939 – Betty Jameson
1940 – Betty Jameson
1967 – Mary Lou Dill
1985 – Michiko Hattori
1995 – Kelli Kuehne
1996 – Kelli Kuehne
2017 – Sophia Schubert

Women's Western Amateur champions
2002 – Janice Olivencia
2018 – Emilee Hoffman

Honda Broderick Award
1978 – Deborah Petrizzi
1990 – Michiko Hattori
1993 – Charlotta Sörenstam
1997 – Heather Bowie

Marilyn Smith Award
1991 – Michiko Hattori
1997 – Heather Bowie

See also
Texas Longhorns men's golf

References